Rupa-Rupa or High Jungle is one of the eight natural regions of Peru. It is located between 400 and 1,000 m above the sea level to the east of the Andes mountain range in the Amazon basin of Peru. This region has many long, narrow valleys and fluvial mountain trails (canyons called pongos). The weather is warm, humid, and rainy.

This region has a tropical flora.

The fauna includes the Brazilian tapir (sachavaca, also called mountain cow), the white-lipped peccary (huangana), and the jaguar (otorongo).

Rupa Rupa is the hottest region in Peru.

Overview 
Andean Continental Divide
 

Mountain Top:

 Mountain passes – 4,100 m  
 Puna grassland  
 Andean-alpine desert  
 Snow line – about 5,000 m  
 Janca – Rocks, Snow and Ice     
 Peak

See also
 Altitudinal zonation
 Climate zones by altitude

Literature 

Montane ecology
Physiographic regions of Peru
Tropical Andes